Shadowmind is an original novel written by Christopher Bulis and based on the long-running British science fiction television series Doctor Who. It was number 16 in the New Adventures and features the Seventh Doctor, Ace and Bernice. A prelude to the novel, also penned by Bulis, appeared in Doctor Who Magazine #202.

Reception 
In 1994, Science Fiction Chronicles Don D'Ammassa reviewed the novel as "an interesting story."

References

External links
Shadowmind Prelude

The Cloister Library - Shadowmind

1993 British novels
1993 science fiction novels
Virgin New Adventures
Novels by Christopher Bulis
Seventh Doctor novels